The ProSport LM3000, also known as the ProSport 3000 Spyder, is a sports prototype race car, first built in 1991. It was later adapted into GT-style racing, and competed in the GT2/Group GT3 classes of the British GT Championship. It also notably entered and competed in the 1997 24 Hours of Daytona, finishing 33rd-place overall, being driven by Kevin Sherwood, Mike Millard, Peter Hardman, and Nigel Greensall.

References

Sports prototypes
Mid-engined cars
Rear-wheel-drive vehicles
Le Mans Prototypes
Grand tourer racing cars